In mathematics — specifically, in ergodic theory — a maximising measure is a particular kind of probability measure.  Informally, a probability measure μ is a maximising measure for some function f if the integral of f with respect to μ is "as big as it can be".  The theory of maximising measures is relatively young and quite little is known about their general structure and properties.

Definition

Let X be a topological space and let T : X → X be a continuous function.  Let Inv(T) denote the set of all Borel probability measures on X that are invariant under T, i.e., for every Borel-measurable subset A of X, μ(T−1(A)) = μ(A).  (Note that, by the Krylov-Bogolyubov theorem, if X is compact and metrizable,  Inv(T) is non-empty.)  Define, for continuous functions f : X → R, the maximum integral function β by

A probability measure μ in Inv(T) is said to be a maximising measure for f if

Properties

 It can be shown that if X is a compact space, then Inv(T) is also compact with respect to the topology of weak convergence of measures.  Hence, in this case, each continuous function f : X → R has at least one maximising measure.
 If T is a continuous map of a compact metric space X into itself and E is a topological vector space that is densely and continuously embedded in C(X; R), then the set of all f in E that have a unique maximising measure is equal to a countable intersection of open dense subsets of E.

References

 
  

Ergodic theory
Measures (measure theory)